Salado is a Spanish adjective meaning "salty", and may refer to:

 Salado, Arkansas, community in Independence County
 Salado, Sonora, a small community in Álamos Municipality
 Salado, Tamaulipas, former town in the state of Tamaulipas, Mexico
 Salado, Texas, village in Bell County
 Salado Creek, in Bexar County, Texas
 Battle of Salado Creek (1842)
 Salado Creek AVA, wine region in Stanislaus County, California
 Salado culture, multicultural group in today's Southwestern U.S., from the 12th through 15th centuries CE
 Saladoblanco, town and municipality in Colombia

See also
 Salado River (disambiguation)